On 17 June 2022, two people died from being asphyxiated during a stampede at the gate of Gelora Bandung Lautan Api Stadium, Bandung, West Java, Indonesia to watch the 2022 President's Cup group stage match between Persib Bandung as host and Persebaya Surabaya.

Details
Persib as the host announced that they were only providing 15,000 tickets, per local police recommendation for safety, for the match against Persebaya at 20:30 UTC+7, 17 June 2022. Gelora Bandung Lautan Api Stadium has a maximum capacity of 38,000. However, at the time, the stadium was full of supporters from both teams. Bonekmania, Persebaya supporters, came to Bandung in large numbers, although they were only given 1,500 quota by the host. Some of them entered the arena without tickets. Supporters who did not have tickets entered the arena by climbing the fence and stadium walls to the second floor, even some of the entrance gates were rammed. The police estimated that 45,000 supporters from both team were in the stadium, damaging eight entrance gates that had been closed.

At 19:00, before the match started, the entrance gates were closed and there were still many spectators outside the stadium who were forced to go inside. Two victims were in the crowd that forced their way into the stadium, which was full long before the match started. The police also stated that it was possible that both victims fell down after getting being asphyxiated, and got trampled down by other supporters.

After they were successfully pulled out, they received medical assistance and were then rushed to Sartika Asih Hospital, but both died in the hospital.

Victims
Ahmad Solihin, a 29-year-old resident of Bandung, and Sofiana Yusuf, a 20-year-old resident of Bogor, were the two people killed in the stampede.

Aftermath
In response to the event, Erwin Tobing as head of Disciplinary Committee of PSSI released that they will assist the incident investigation. Persib posted a condolence through their social media and attended the funeral of the victim. Many people from different supporter community sent their condolence of the incident on the social media. As the investigation started, match officials found fake officials ID card that might grant people who wore it access in to the stadium. Police lined the area and started the investigation after the incident. Bobotoh accused the match officials for terrible crowd management as the cause of the incident. They held a demonstration in front of Persib office on 21 June 2022.

Despite the incident, the match went on to the end with Persib winning 31.

The last two matches of Group C were played at Si Jalak Harupat Stadium, Bandung, and were held behind closed doors.

On 23 June 2022, PSSI finished their investigation and released their statements via official website by listed several points of result of the investigation. Disciplinary committee of PSSI imposed Persib a fine of IDR 50 Million and a ban on playing at the Gelora Bandung Lautan Api Stadium during the 2022 President's Cup.

Since this incident until at least early August, Persib fans often held demonstrations at Graha Persib (Persib's office). They demanded the club to improve the ticketing system.

See also
2022 Kanjuruhan Stadium disaster

References 

2022 in Indonesia
2022 disasters in Indonesia
2022 in Indonesian football
Stadium disasters
Crowd collapses and crushes
Association football controversies
Man-made disasters in Indonesia
Human stampedes in 2022
Human stampedes in Asia